Hofmeister may refer to:

 Hofmeister (surname)
 Hofmeister (office), medieval and early modern court position
 Hofmeister Lager, a UK lager brand
 Friedrich Hofmeister Musikverlag, German music publisher, short: Hofmeister
 Hofmeister series, a classification of ions in order of their ability to salt out or salt in proteins

See also 
 Hoffmeister, a surname

ja:ホフマイスター